María de Jesús Castillo Nicacio (born July 6, 1983, in Guadalajara, Jalisco) is a Mexican former footballer. She competed for her native country at the 2004 Summer Olympics in Athens, Greece, where she finished in 8th place with the Mexico women's national football team.

See also 
 List of Mexico women's international footballers

References

External links
 

1983 births
Living people
Mexican women's footballers
Mexico women's international footballers
Footballers at the 2004 Summer Olympics
Olympic footballers of Mexico
Footballers from Guadalajara, Jalisco
Women's association football defenders
Footballers at the 2003 Pan American Games
Pan American Games bronze medalists for Mexico
Medalists at the 2003 Pan American Games
Pan American Games medalists in football
20th-century Mexican women
21st-century Mexican women
Mexican footballers